Marie Walewska, Countess Walewska (née Łączyńska; ; 7 December 1786 – 11 December 1817) was a Polish noblewoman and an important figure at the court of Emperor Napoleon I with the role to influence him positively for the Polish cause. In her later years she married count Philippe Antoine d'Ornano, an influential Napoleonic officer.

Early life
Walewska was born as first child into a wealthy noble family in Kiernozia, to Count Mathieu (Mateusz) Łączyński, a landowner and starosta of Gostyń; and Eva Zaborowska, whose family was wealthy as well. Walewska had six siblings: Benedykt Jozef, Hieronim, Teodor, Honorata, Katarzyna and Urszula-Teresa. She grew up in her ancestral home, Kiernozia palace, where she received upper-class education. Nicholas Chopin, Frédéric Chopin's father, for instance, was one of her tutors.

In 1794 her father participated in the military struggle for Polish independence and was mortally wounded at the Battle of Maciejowice, leaving behind a widow, seven children (five of them surviving into adulthood), and a dwindling livelihood.

A year later Prussia, the Habsburg monarchy and the Russian Empire effectively ended the Polish-Lithuanian Commonwealth national sovereignty through the third partition of Poland, when the Łączyński lands were incorporated into Russia.

As the eldest, with her brothers having debts, it was up to her to secure the future of her family. At the age of eighteen she was married by her mother to the sixty-eight-year-old Athenasius count Colonna-Walewski, a wealthy landowner, starosta of Warka district and a once-chamberlain to the last Polish king, Stanisław August Poniatowski. During their marriage Walewska became two sons, Antoni Rudolf Bazyli, born on 14 June 1805 and Alexandre Florian Joseph Colonna-Walewski. Antoni was immediately seized by Marie’s sister-in-law and nieces (by marriage), who were a lot older than the young countess.

Walewska and Napoleon 
It is believed by historians that Alexandre was a natural son of Napoleon I, although Athanasius legally acknowledged him as his own son. DNA research indicated Alexandre's membership in the genetic male-line of the imperial House of Bonaparte

Maria Walewska met Napoleon for the first time in 1806 in Błonie, or in Jabłonna. According to Maria's own memoirs, she spoke briefly with the French emperor in an inn when his carriage was changing horses, but the meeting was inconclusive. However, Napoleon remembered her for her extraordinary conversation and requested to see her in Warsaw, intending to have regular meetings with her. The political context for Poland was complicated, the country had been wiped off the map at the end of the previous century and Polish nationalists were hoping Napoleon might bring the country back to life.

They met again at a ball hosted by count Stanislaw Potocki in his Warsaw residence. Walewska was being advised to work towards a position in the inner circle of Napolean by the Emperor's aide, General Géraud Duroc (Grand Marshal of the Palace). A number of Polish aristocrats asked her the same, they hoped that she could influence the emperor to support Poland in its struggle to regain independence from Prussia, the Habsburg Empire and the Russian Empire. From her memoirs can be concluded, Walewska maintained that she forced herself to get intimately involved with Napoleon for purely patriotic reasons:"The sacrifice was complete. It was all about harvesting fruit now, achieving this one single equivalence [convincing Napoleon to support Polish independence movement], which could excuse my debased position. This was the thought that possessed me. Ruling over my will it did not allow me to fall under the weight of my bad consciousness and sadness."

The intimate relationship was initially kept secret, even though unofficially it was one of the most widely commented news in Warsaw's higher circles. Walewska visited Napoleon, residing in the capital's Royal Castle, only at nights and would secretly leave the building each morning. The relationship progressed when Napoleon moved to his field headquarters in Finckenstein Palace in East Prussia (now Kamieniec Suski, Poland): Walewska followed him there and they moved into neighbouring apartments. As Maria was extraordinarily pious for her times, they still maintained apparent secrecy: she refused to leave the part of the building in which they lived, fearing being seen by officers surrounding Napoleon, many of whom were her acquaintances or relatives.

In 1809 Walewska followed Napoleon during his journey to Vienna, where she lived in a house near Schönbrunn Palace, Napoleon's residence. During her sojourn in Vienna she became pregnant and returned to Walewice in order to give birth to her second son, Alexandre Joseph. Although Alexandre was rumoured to be the natural son of the Emperor, he was officially recognised by count Athenasius as his son and thus bore the name of the counts of Colonna-Walewski.

In 1810 Napoleon returned to Paris, where he was soon joined by Walewska. She settled in a palatial residence in the Rue de Montmorency and was given a large rent of 120,000 francs and a permission to enter all of the imperial museums, but her relationship with Napoleon ended. The Emperor planned to divorce Josephine and instead arrange a strategically marriage to Marie Louise, daughter of the Austrian Emperor. Maintaining his relationship with Walewska seemed inappropriate to gain that goal. Walewska's future and that of her son were nevertheless assured by the grant of large land estates in the Kingdom of Naples.

Later years 

In 1812 Maria divorced count Colonna-Walewski. To facilitate it, her brother, Benedykt Jozef, admitted to forcing the marriage upon her. It remains unclear whether this was the truth, as in her memoirs Maria stated that her mother influenced her choice to marry Athenasius. As a settlement, she and her oldest son received half of count Walewski's estates, which even though heavily indebted, represented considerable wealth.

In 1816 Maria married her longtime admirer and lover, count Philippe Antoine d'Ornano. They settled in Liege, as d'Ornano did not want to return to Paris due to his pro-Napoleonic allegiances. In 1817 Maria gave birth to count d'Ornano's son, Rudolph Augustus, and she died in Paris shortly afterwards due to a prolonged kidney illness. Before her death, she completed her memoirs, which were addressed to her husband. Upon request from her Polish relatives her body was exhumed from Père Lachaise Cemetery in Paris and moved to her family crypt in Kiernozia.

Descendants 
Maria Walewska left three sons:
 Her son from the first marriage, count Antoni Colonna-Walewski, settled in Poland and little is known about his life.
 Count Alexandre Joseph Colonna-Walewski (4 May 1810 – 27 October 1868), her son from her relationship with Napoleon I became an important figure in the 19th century French politics: he was an influential diplomat and a cabinet minister. He maintained his whole life that his father was Count Colonna-Walewski.
 Her third son, Rodolphe d'Ornano, was also an influential figure in the French society; his descendants created the well-known fragrance and cosmetics brand Sisley.

Marie Walewska also had a niece, named Barth, who lived in Bergen, Norway. The Walewska family thus has descendants in Norway living today.

Legacy 
Walewska's eventful life attracted attention of a number of Polish and French historians. As her memoirs remained unpublished until the late 19th century, she was a subject of much speculation. The first scholar to write a complete account of her life was a French biographer Frederic Masson, who was allowed by d'Ornano family to use her memoirs.

In the 1930s her adventures were once again described by her descendant, Antoine Philippe Rodolphe, 4th count d'Ornano in a book entitled 'Marie Walewska, "l'épouse polonaise de Napolėon"'. It was a belletristic biography that until the mid-20th century was considered as a key source on Walewska, as Antoine d'Ornano claimed that it was based on never published documents remaining in the archives of La Branchoire, the family castle.

Count d'Ornano's account presented Maria as a devout patriot and an influential political figure. His book claimed that she was involved in taking major political decisions related to the development of Duchy of Warsaw and engaged herself in disputes with figures such as Józef Poniatowski or Joachim Lelewel. These allegations spurred controversy among Polish historians, who noticed that both the described events and the dates quoted by d'Ornano seemed unlikely.

Biographer Marian Brandys attempted to deal with some of these doubts in his book "The troubles with Lady Walewska" and he went as far as questioning the very existence of documents from La Branchoire. His main argument was that the facts presented in the book were unrealistic in light of broader historical knowledge about Napoleonic campaigns and the politics of the Duchy of Warsaw. He also noted the numerous discrepancies between the French and English editions of the book.

Lawsuit 
D'Ornano's book had an equally profound effect on the historian circles in France. In 1950s Jean Savant, a renowned historian and writer, wrote a book about Walewska in which he attempted to recreate a scientific biography of Maria Walewska. Before publishing the book, he printed certain extracts from it in Elle, a popular woman's magazine, which resulted in a lawsuit from count d'Ornano and his descendants.

The dispute revolved around copyright issues: Savant allowed the publication of extracts from his work, which included alleged excerpts from Maria's own accounts, taken from d'Ornano's book. However, he failed to appropriately reference them. Antoine d'Ornano sued him for illegally appropriating contents taken from "Marie Walewska, "l'épouse polonaise de Napolėon"", and when Antoine died, his descendants claimed that the aforementioned extracts were not historical source materials, as Savant claimed, but merely an invention of the author. The legal battle continued for a few years, and it was put to an end by Cour de Cassation which decided that Savant acted legally.

The d'Ornano family never allowed any historian to come into contact with the alleged Walewska archives. During the lawsuit they maintained that in fact, the documents never existed. However, Savant in his next book "l'Affaire Walewska" attempted to prove the contrary.

Marie Walewska in film 
Walewska was the subject of the 1914 Polish film Countess Walewska, directed by Aleksander Hertz.

Her story is also told in a 1937 film Conquest, also known as Marie Walewska. Greta Garbo plays Marie Walewska to Charles Boyer's Napoleon. Boyer and art director Cedric Gibbons were both nominated for Academy Awards for the film.

The character also appeared in A Soldier's Farewell, an episode of the BBC comedy Dad's Army. She was played by Alexandra Lara in the 2002 Napoléon miniseries.

References

Further reading
 Potocka-Wąsowiczowa, Anna 'Memoirs of a witness.' Państwowy Instytut Wydawniczy, Warsaw 1965.
 d'Ornano, Antoine 'Marie Walewska, "l'ėpouse polonaise de Napolėon"', Paris 1937.
 Brandys, Marian 'The troubles with Lady Walewska' Iskry, Warsaw 1971.
 Kukiel, Marian 'The fairytale life of Maria Walewska', Warsaw 1939.
 Mauersberg, Adam 'Maria Walewska', Ateneum, Warsaw 1938.
 Masson, Frederic "Marie Walewska",  E. Guillaume, Paris 1897.

External links

 
 

1786 births
1817 deaths
Polish diplomats
Polish Roman Catholics
Mistresses of Napoleon
Deaths from kidney failure
Marie
Burials at Père Lachaise Cemetery